Schizopelte is a genus of lichen-forming fungi in the family Opegraphaceae. The genus was circumscribed by Theodor Magnus Fries in 1875. It was resurrected for use in 2011 by Damien Ertz and Anders Tehler, who published a phylogenetic study of the order Arthoniales. In addition to the type species, S. californica, they included a former Hubbsia species, a former Llimonaea species, and a species new to science in the resurrected Schizopelte.

Species
Schizopelte lumbricoides 
Schizopelte parishii 
Schizopelte californica 
Schizopelte crustosa 

All four Schizopelte species are endemic to the north-western American coast.

References

Arthoniomycetes
Lichen genera
Arthoniomycetes genera
Taxa described in 1875
Taxa named by Theodor Magnus Fries